Mads Hak (died 1555) was a Danish composer and mathematician.

See also
List of Danish composers

References

Danish composers
Male composers
1555 deaths
Year of birth missing